Polyptychodon (meaning 'many-folded tooth') is a genus of pliosaurid found in Middle-Late Cretaceous marine deposits in southern England, France and Argentina. It has been considered a nomen dubium in a 2016 review.

History of discovery
 
The type species, P. interruptus is known from an isolated tooth from the Late Cretaceous Chalk Group of southern England. Owen described a second nominal species of the genus, P. continuus, from an isolated tooth collected in the Hythe Formation of Maidstone, Kent. (The macronarian sauropod Dinodocus was mistakenly thought to be conspecific with P. continuus before it was correctly recognized as a dinosaur and not a plesiosaur.)

Numerous pliosaurid teeth and vertebrae from England and eastern France have been previously assigned to Polyptychodon, including isolated vertebrae from France which were misidentified as a sauropod. However, a 2016 re-evaluation found Polyptychodon and its types species to be dubious, and that numerous remains from the Chalk Group in England that had been referred to the genus most likely represent different species of plesiosaurs, with some teeth possibly being referable to Polycotylidae. Similar fossils of pliosaurs were found also in Czech Republic.

The species Polyptychodon patagonicus (Ameghino, 1893), based on crocodile teeth discovered in Argentina, shares the same genus name. According to a 2010 study, P. patagonicus is a nomen vanum and a nomen dubium.

Misassigned species

Polyptychodon hudsoni (holotytpe, SMU 60313) was described from the Turonian-age Eagle Ford Formation of Dallas, Texas.

See also

 Timeline of plesiosaur research

References

External links
Polyptychodon in the Paleobiology Database

Late Cretaceous plesiosaurs of Europe
Cenomanian genus first appearances
Turonian genus extinctions
Fossil taxa described in 1841
Taxa named by Richard Owen
Nomina dubia
Sauropterygian genera